Emma Borg is a professor of philosophy at the University of Reading. She specialises in philosophy of language, philosophy of mind, and philosophy of cognitive science.

Publications

References

External links 

 
 Profile at the University of Reading
 

Academics of the University of Reading
Philosophers of language
British women philosophers
Year of birth missing (living people)
Living people